Wally Clark (born 25 May 1936) was an Australian rules footballer who played for Fitzroy in the Victorian Football League (VFL).

Fitzroy
Clark, who was at Fitzroy from underage level, played as a rover. He was their top goal-kicker with 21 goals in 1962 but had his best goal kicking year when he bagged 33 two years earlier.

Although he retired from the seniors in 1963, Clark continued in the Fitzroy reserves as captain-coach and won a Gardiner Medal for his on field performances.

Saturday, 6 July 1963

Clark coached the senior Fitzroy side for only one match.

Predictions
With the team having lost the first nine home-and-away matches in the 1963 season, and with its opponents on the day (the second week-end of the split round 10) being the powerful Geelong side that would go on to win the 1963 VFL premiership, nobody gave the Fitzroy team a chance.

The selected team
With its captain-coach, Kevin Murray, and its regular first rover, Graham Campbell, absent in South Australia with the Victorian Interstate side -- and with Geoff Doubleday, Joe Dixon, and Ted Lovett unavailable (each had returned to their country clubs) -- the selectors made eight changes to the preceding round's team (and in the process, dropped both Stewart Duncan and Brett Pollock, and relegated Ray Slocum to the bench as 20th man) and, as well, appointed the (then) Second XVIII coach, Wally Clark, as the team's stand-in coach (it was the only time that Clark ever coached the First XVIII).

With seven teenagers, and only six of the twenty chosen having played more than 20 First XVIII games, the team was very inexperienced:
{|
|valign=top|

The match
The match, played at the Brunswick Street Oval -- with Geelong having already won the Under 19s game, 10.11 (71) to 6.10 (46), and the Second XVIII's match, 8.13 (61) to 4.8 (32) in the curtain raisers -- provided "one of the biggest upsets in that decade of VFL football" (Spaull, 2014), when the Fitzroy team thrashed the Geelong side 9.13 (67) to 3.13 (31), not only leading Geelong 3.7 (25) to 1.6 (12) at half time, but, also -- following Clark's inspiring half-time address delivered to the players in room packed with Fitzroy supporters (whom regular coach Kevin Murray routinely excluded from the change-rooms) -- scoring 5.4 (34) to Geelong's 1.3 (9) in the third quarter.

Remainder of the 1963 season
This extraordinary performance strongly contrasts with the fact that Fitzroy did not win another match during the entire 1963 home-and-away season, failed to win a single match in the 1964 season, and did not experience another victory until the second round of the 1965 season.

Latrobe
The following season he went to Tasmania where he became captain-coach of NWFU club Latrobe. He coached and played for four years resulting is a  47 wins and 23 loses.  His side were runners up in 1966.

Notes

References
 Holmesby, Russell and Main, Jim (2007). The Encyclopedia of AFL Footballers. 7th ed. Melbourne: Bas Publishing.
 Lord, Sam, "The Miracle Match", lions.com.au, 17 July 2014: Brian Pert is fifth from the left in the photograph.
 Peisse, Ken (2014), Miracle Match: The Day David Downed Goliath, Brunswick St, July 6 1963, Mt Eliza: Ken Piesse Football & Cricket Books. 
 Spaull, Roger (2014), "Bryan Clements -- Fitzroy FC -- A Day To Remember At The Brunswick Street Oval", Boyles Football Photos, 18 May 2014.

External links
 
 

1936 births
Australian rules footballers from Victoria (Australia)
Fitzroy Football Club players
Fitzroy Football Club coaches
Latrobe Football Club players
Living people